The Multi-Mission Effects Vehicle (MMEV) was a dual-purpose short range surface-to-air and anti-tank platform intended for use by the Canadian Forces. It was based on Air Defense Anti-Tank System (ADATS) technology, and integrated onto an 8×8 wheeled LAV III. The MMEV project was canceled in November 2006.

Development
In late September 2005, the DND announced a $750M project for 30 MMEVs. Prime contractor for the first, $100M phase of the project was to be Oerlikon Contraves Canada. The Canadian Forces worked with Defence Research and Development Canada and Canadian industry through the Technology Demonstration Program to develop fire control systems and ergonomics that would directly contribute to the development of the MMEV. Oerlikon Contraves Canada was selected for the MMEV project since it owns the intellectual property rights to the ADATS technology, the cornerstone of the new MMEV system.

The MMEV was designed to engage fixed wing aircraft and helicopters at low to medium altitudes (20+ km), and land-based targets at up to 8 km. The MMEV was designed with a full ISTAR platform, enabling it to communicate with NATO and Tri-Services of the Canadian Forces.

Equipment
The MMEV was to integrate the latest technology, such the Oerlikon Contraves search-and-acquisition X-Tar 3D radar providing a very high detection probability, covering a range of 25 kilometres. A resistance to electronic and electro-optical systems built by Oerlikon / Rheinmetall.

References

External links
 Rheinmetall Defence - Multi-Mission Effects Vehicle 
 Rheinmetall Defence - Canada has announced its intent to acquire MMEV
 CASR Background   —  CF  Multi-Mission Effects Vehicle (MMEV) Project
 Multi-Mission Effects Vehicle (MMEV)
 Army to keep aging tanks 

Self-propelled anti-aircraft weapons
Weapons of Canada
Armoured fighting vehicles of Canada
Abandoned military projects of Canada
Eight-wheeled vehicles
Mowag Piranha